The 2022 Valour FC season was the fourth season in the history of Valour FC. In addition to the Canadian Premier League, the club competed in the Canadian Championship.

Current squad
As of September 6, 2022.

Transfers

In

Transferred in

Loans in

Draft picks 
Valour FC will make the following selections in the 2022 CPL–U Sports Draft. Draft picks are not automatically signed to the team roster. Only those who are signed to a contract will be listed as transfers in.

Out

Transferred out

Pre-season and friendlies

Competitions
Matches are listed in Winniped local time: Central Daylight Time (UTC−5) until November 5, and Central Standard Time (UTC−6) otherwise.

Overview

Canadian Premier League

Table

Results by match

Matches

Canadian Championship

Statistics

Squad and statistics 

|-

|}

Top scorers

Disciplinary record

References

External links 
Official Site

2022
2022 Canadian Premier League
Canadian soccer clubs 2022 season